Say It Like You Feel It is the fifth studio album by American electronic music group Cash Cash, released on May 14, 2021 via Atlantic and Big Beat Records. The album has a total of 18 tracks and is their longest album to date. The group released the album cover art as an NFT on April 26, 2022. Say It Like You Feel It includes collaborations with singers Abir, Alex Newell, Brandon Colbein, Conor Maynard, Chris Carrabba of Dashboard Confessional, Georgia Ku, Harloe, Laura White, Lukas Graham, Nasri of Magic!, Nikki Vianna, Phoebe Ryan, Rozes, Tayler Buono, Violet Days, Wrabel and rapper Wiz Khalifa.

Background and recording
Group member Jean Paul Makhlouf spoke about the meaning behind the album's name. He stated:

JP Makhlouf noted that the song selections for the album came together naturally. He also said that the album was a "form of therapy" for the group. According to Samuel Frisch, the songs on the album were created as "shared experiences a lot of people can relate to." The group recorded the album in their home studio.

Singles
"Matches" was released on March 3, 2017 as the lead single from the album. According to JP Makhlouf, the song is considered "relatable" and "nostalgic". The song peaked at number 38 on the Hot Dance/Electronic Songs chart.

"All My Love" was released on July 7, 2017 as the second single from the album. The song peaked at number 23 on the Hot Dance/Electronic Songs chart. The song reached number 74 on the Billboard Hot Dance/Electronic Songs year-end chart in 2017. The music video was released on October 5, 2017.

"Belong" was released on December 15, 2017 as the third single from the album. The music video was released that same day.

"Jewel" was released on February 14, 2018 as the fourth single from the album. The song peaked at number 35 on the Hot Dance/Electronic Songs chart.

"Finest Hour" was released on April 12, 2018 as the fifth single from the album. The song peaked at number 14 on the Hot Dance/Electronic Songs chart. It was serviced to dance radio on April 17. The song reached number 35 on the Billboard Hot Dance/Electronic Songs year-end chart in 2018. On January 2020, the song was certified gold in the US.

"Call You" was released on November 30, 2018 as the sixth single from the album. The song peaked at number eight on the Dance/Mix Show Airplay chart. The song reached number 29 on the Billboard Dance/Mix Show Airplay year-end chart in 2019.

"Mean It" was released on January 24, 2020 as the seventh single from the album. The song peaked at number four on the Dance/Mix Show Airplay chart. The song reached number 48 on the Billboard Dance/Mix Show Airplay year-end chart in 2020.

"Gasoline" was released on May 15, 2020 as the eighth single from the album. The song peaked at number 36 on the Hot Dance/Electronic Songs chart. The song reached number 40 on the Billboard Dance/Mix Show Airplay year-end chart in 2020.

"Love You Now" was released on October 9, 2020 as the ninth single from the album. The song peaked at number 45 on the Hot Dance/Electronic Songs chart.

"Too Late" was released on February 12, 2021 as the tenth single from the album. The song peaked at number 14 on the Hot Dance/Electronic Songs chart. The song reached number 68 on the Billboard Hot Dance/Electronic Songs year-end chart in 2021.

"Ride or Die" was released on April 23, 2021 as the eleventh and final single from the album. The song peaked at number 29 on the Hot Dance/Electronic Songs chart.

"42" peaked at number 41 on the Hot Dance/Electronic Songs chart despite not being released as a single.

Reception

Gabrielle Poccia of Riff Magazine called the album "a smokey, dry-ice-filled breath of fresh air". She added, "Say It Like You Feel It is an impressive work of pop music and emotion. It's the perfect album to dance yourself clean." Maggie Cocco of Melodic Magazine said, "Say It Like You Feel It has all the hallmarks you've come to expect of a good pop infused EDM album. The music drives, builds, and drops in a satisfyingly familiar cadence beneath sticky vocal hooks." Cameron Defaria of Dancing Astronaut stated that the album was "a glowing product that highlights Cash Cash's glimmering production style from start to finish across 18 cuts."

Track listing

Personnel
Credits for Say It Like You Feel It adapted from AllMusic.

Cash Cash
Samuel Frisch – composer, mastering, mixing, producer, programming, recording
Alex Makhlouf – composer, mastering, mixing, producer, programming, recording
Jean Paul Makhlouf – backing vocals, composer, mastering, mixing, producer, programming, recording

Additional musicians
Abir – composer, featured artist
Nasri – featured artist
Tayler Buono – featured artist
Chris Carrabba – composer, featured artist
Brandon Colbein – featured artist
Harloe – featured artist
Georgia Ku – composer, featured artist
Lukas Graham – featured artist
Conor Maynard – featured artist
Alex Newell – featured artist
Rozes – composer featured artist, vocals
Phoebe Ryan – featured artist
Nikki Vianna – featured artist
Violet Days – featured artist
Laura White – featured artist
Wiz Khalifa – featured artist
Zookëper – composer, drum programming, keyboards, producer, programming

Production
James Abrahart – composer
Ben Berger – composer
Evan Bogart – composer
Captain Cuts – vocal producer
Ben Castillo – recording
Leroy Clampitt – composer
David Dalton – composer
Lukas Forchhammer – composer
Grace Fulmer – composer
Frank Hendler – composer
Joe Janiak – composer
Nathanial John – composer
Ari Leff – composer
Dijon McFarlane – composer
Ryan McMahon – composer
Michael Pollack – composer
Ryan Rabin – composer
Cameron Thomaz – composer
Henrik Wolsing – composer

References

2021 albums
Cash Cash albums
Atlantic Records albums
Big Beat Records (American record label) albums